The Admirable Crichton is a 1918 British silent comedy film directed by G. B. Samuelson and starring Basil Gill, Mary Dibley and James Lindsay. It was based on the 1902 play The Admirable Crichton by J. M. Barrie.

In 1919 it was filmed by Cecil B. DeMille as Male and Female starring Gloria Swanson.

Premise
When they are stranded on a desert island, an aristocratic family fall increasingly under the sway of their charismatic, competent butler.

Cast
 Basil Gill as Crichton
 Mary Dibley as Lady Mary Lasenby
 James Lindsay as Woolley
 Lennox Pawle as Lord Loam
 Lillian Hall-Davis as Lady Agatha Lasenby

References

External links

1918 films
British silent feature films
British comedy films
1910s English-language films
Films directed by G. B. Samuelson
British films based on plays
Films based on works by J. M. Barrie
Films set in London
1918 comedy films
British black-and-white films
Films about survivors of seafaring accidents or incidents
Films set on uninhabited islands
Silent comedy films
1910s British films
Silent adventure films